The Journal of Epidemiology is a peer-reviewed open access journal for epidemiological studies. It is the official journal in English language published by the Japan Epidemiological Association. The editor-in-chief is Kota Katanoda (National Cancer Center, Tokyo, Japan). According to the Journal Citation Reports, the journal has a 2020 impact factor of 3.211.

References

External links

Epidemiology journals
Bimonthly journals
Academic journals published by learned and professional societies